S.S.C. Napoli endured a horror season in 2003–04 Serie B, relegated to Serie C by the end of the season. The target prior to the season was promotion to Serie A, and several experienced players were brought in to achieve that goal, among them Massimo Carrera, Renato Olive, Rubens Pasino and Gianluca Savoldi. Especially the signing of Savoldi was significant, since he is the son of legendary Napoli striker Giuseppe Savoldi. The club also lost its captain Roberto Stellone to Reggina.

Supporter Sergio Ercolano was killed when falling down from the stands at the derby with Avellino. That forced Napoli to play three home matches in front of an empty stadium. When coach Andrea Agostinelli was replaced by Luigi Simoni, Napoli at least salvaged a 13th place in the table, and looked set to stay in Serie B for 2004-05.

That changed when it became apparent that president Salvatore Naldi could not fund the club any longer, which meant bankruptcy for the second time in the Neapolitan footballing history. By August 2004, Napoli was declared bankrupt. Film producer Aurelio De Laurentiis refounded Napoli under the name "Napoli Soccer", and were placed in the 2004–05 Serie C1.

Squad

Goalkeepers
  Emanuele Manitta
  Pierluigi Brivio
  Andrea Argentati

Defenders
  Alessandro Del Grosso
  Marco Zamboni
  Vittorio Tosto
  Sean Sogliano
  Mario Cvitanović
  Marco Quadrini
  Massimo Carrera
  Daniele Portanova
  Mauro Bonomi

Midfielders
  José Luís Vidigal
  Marko Perović
  Dario Marcolin
  Montezine
  Renato Olive
  Rubens Pasino
  Nicola Zanini
  Andrea Bernini
  Cataldo Montesanto
  Francesco Montervino
  Gennaro Esposito
  Gonzalo Martínez

Attackers
  David Sesa
  Gianluca Savoldi
  Davide Dionigi
  Antonio Floro Flores
  Massimiliano Vieri

Serie B

References

External links

S.S.C. Napoli seasons
Napoli